Brenda Odimba (also spelled as Brända Audimba) is a Belgian engineer and activist.
Odimba was one of the spokespeople of the 2021 hunger strike of undocumented migrants in Belgium.
Odimba founded the association NewSisterhood.

Early life
Odimba was born is Brussels. Her father is Belgian and her mother was born in Congo. Her mother lived in Belgium as an undocumented worker for a number of years.
Obimba studied at Université libre de Bruxelles and Vrije Universiteit Brussel.
She is a trained engineer.

Decolonial activist
Odimba is a decolonial activist.
She helped organize the George Floyd protests in Belgium in 2020 and is part of an unofficial Black Lives Matter movement. Odibma participated in the protests for the removal of statues of Leopold II in Belgium. She also advocated instead for public spaces dedicated to the memory of Patrice Lumumba.

Protest at the Béguinage Church
As a child of an undocumented migrant, Odimba acted in support of the 2021 hunger strike of undocumented migrants in Belgium, which took place at the Béguinage Church in Brussels. 
Odimba called on the Belgian government to align its legislation on undocumented migrants with the rules of the Universal Declaration of Human Rights of the United Nations. 
After the hunger strike had been brought to an end, Odimba denounced the rhetoric of Sammy Mahdi, the Belgian State Secretary for Asylum and Migration at the time, as manipulative. Odimba deplored that the strike had as an unintended consequence to divide the undocumented population between those who took part in the strike and those who didn’t.

Climate justice activist
Odimba is an environmental activist. In 2021, she was one of the plaintiffs who took the Belgian public authorities to court over their failing to take action to meet the international climate targets.
Odimba also objected to individual projects by the oil industry to expand their production capacity.

References

Living people
Black Lives Matter people
Climate activists
Vrije Universiteit Brussel alumni
People from Brussels
Belgian activists
Université libre de Bruxelles alumni
Year of birth missing (living people)